A hat-trick or hat trick is the achievement of a generally positive feat three times in a match, or another achievement based on the number three.

Origin
The term first appeared in 1858 in cricket, to describe H. H. Stephenson taking three wickets with three consecutive deliveries. Fans held a collection for Stephenson, and presented him with a hat bought with the proceeds. The term was used in print for the first time in 1865 in the Chelmsford Chronicle. The term was eventually adopted by many other sports including hockey, association football, Formula 1 racing, rugby, and water polo.

Use

Association football

A hat-trick occurs in association football when a player scores three goals (not necessarily consecutive) in a single game; whereas scoring two goals (in a single match) is called a brace. In common with other official record-keeping rules, all goals scored during the regulation 90 minutes, plus extra time if required, are counted but goals in a penalty shootout are excluded from the tally.  The fastest recorded time to score a hat-trick is 70 seconds, a record set by Alex Torr in a Sunday league game in 2013. The previous record of 90 seconds was held by Tommy Ross playing for Ross County against Nairn County on 28 November 1964. The record of the youngest player ever to score a hat-trick was set by Ntinos Pontikas in 1996, while Pelé in 1958 became the youngest to achieve a treble in the World Cup.

The first hat-trick achieved in an international game was by Scottish player John McDougall, against England on 2 March 1878. American player Bert Patenaude scored the first hat-trick in the FIFA World Cup, against Paraguay in the inaugural event in 1930. Three hat-tricks have been scored in a World Cup final: by Geoff Hurst for England in the 1966 final against West Germany, by Kylian Mbappé for France in the 2022 final against Argentina, and by Carli Lloyd for the USA against Japan in the 2015 Women's World Cup final. Lloyd's was, at 16 minutes, the fastest from kickoff in any World Cup match. However, the fastest World Cup hat-trick, as measured by time between goals, belongs to Fabienne Humm of Switzerland, who scored in the 47th, 49th and 52nd minutes against Ecuador in the 2015 group stage.

Traditionally, a player who scores a hat-trick is allowed to keep the match ball as a memento.

Perfect hat-trick

Football has also extended the term, with a perfect hat-trick being when a player scores one right-footed goal, one left-footed goal and one headed goal within one match. In Germany and Austria, the term Hattrick (flawless hat-trick) refers to when a player scores three goals in a row in one half without the half-time break or a goal scored by another player interrupting the performance.

Baseball
In the past, the term was occasionally used to describe when a player struck out three times in a baseball game, and the term golden sombrero was more commonly used when a player struck out four times in a game.

In recent years, hat trick has been more often used to describe when a player hits three home runs in a game.

For example, on 29 August 2015, Toronto Blue Jays fans celebrated Edwin Encarnación's third home run of the game by throwing hats onto the field, similar to the tradition in ice hockey.

Cricket

A hat-trick occurs in cricket when a bowler takes three wickets with consecutive deliveries.

Gaelic football
In Gaelic football, a hat-trick can refer to goals or to points scored.

Eoin Liston scored a second-half hat-trick in the 1978 All-Ireland Senior Football Championship Final.

Michael Quinlivan scored a second-half hat-trick against Armagh in the final game of the 2017 National Football League to secure promotion to Division 2 for Tipperary.

Jack McCaffrey's total of 1–3 in the 2019 All-Ireland Senior Football Championship Final (drawn game) involved a "classic hat-trick" of points, sent over the bar with fist and both feet.

Cillian O'Connor's four goals (accompanied by nine points) in the 2020 All-Ireland Senior Football Championship semi-final at Croke Park broke the 5–3 record set by Johnny Joyce of Dublin in 1960 and matched with 3–9 by Rory Gallagher of Fermanagh in 2002 for the highest individual scorer in any championship football match.

David Clifford scored a hat-trick against Galway in the opening round of the 2021 National Football League.

Handball
In handball, if a player scores three times in a game, a hat-trick is made.

Hockey

In  field hockey and ice hockey, a hat trick occurs when a player scores three goals in a single game. A hat trick in ice hockey, as it is known in its current form, culminates with fans throwing hats onto the ice from the stands.  The tradition is said to have begun among fans in the National Hockey League around the 1950s,
with several conflicting legends from the Canadian cities of Toronto, Montreal, and Guelph of various hatmakers offering a free hat to players who scored a hat trick.

In 1944 the Winnipeg Free Press (29 November 1944, p. 14) reported that "hockey's traditional ‘hat-trick’ – the feat of scoring three goals in a single game – will receive official recognition from the Amateur Hockey Association" of the US by awarding a small silver derby hat to players to mark the accomplishment.

Wayne Gretzky holds the NHL record for the most hat tricks in a career with 50. Harry Hyland scored the league's first hat trick, in the league's first game on 18 December 1917, in which Hyland's Montreal Wanderers defeated the Toronto Arenas 10–9.

Variations
In ice hockey a natural hat trick occurs when a player scores three consecutive goals, uninterrupted by any other player scoring for either team. The NHL record for the fastest natural hat trick is 21 seconds, set by Bill Mosienko in 1952 for the Chicago Blackhawks.

A Gordie Howe hat trick is a tongue-in-cheek play on the feat. It is achieved by scoring a goal, getting an assist, and getting into a fight, all in the same game. Namesake Gordie Howe himself only recorded two in his NHL career. Rick Tocchet accomplished the feat 18 times in his career, the most in NHL history.

In October 1995, Florida Panthers captain Scott Mellanby scored a rat trick, the term coined by teammate John Vanbiesbrouck. Prior to the game, Mellanby killed a rat in the Panthers' locker room with his hockey stick, and proceeded to score a pair of goals later that night. When Mellanby scored a hat trick in a later game, some Florida fans threw plastic rats onto the ice, a tradition that continued for all Panthers' goals throughout the 1996 playoffs. Due to the resulting game delays caused by the necessary clean-up of the plastic rats, the league eventually banned the activity and modified Rule 63 to impose a minor penalty against the home team for a violation. The more traditional practice of fans throwing hats onto the ice following genuine hat tricks remains exempt from this penalty.

Lacrosse
In lacrosse, like other sports with goal scoring, hat tricks occur when a player scores three goals in one game. Fans rarely throw hats onto the playing surface to acknowledge them due to their frequent occurrences in a game. When a player scores six goals in one game, it is referred to as a sock trick.

Motor racing
In motor racing, three successive race wins, winning the same event three times in a row, or securing pole position, fastest lap and race victory in one event may all be referred to as a hat-trick.

Rugby football

In both codes of rugby football (rugby union and rugby league) a hat-trick is when a player scores three or more tries in a game.  In rugby union, a related concept is that of a "full house" (scoring a try, conversion, penalty goal, and drop goal) in a single game. When a player scored two tries, this is often referred to as a brace. As with association football, it is common to award the match ball to a player who scores a hat-trick.

Ken Irvine and Frank Burge both scored 16 hat-tricks in Australian first grade rugby league.

Shaun Johnson scored a hat-trick in under 6 minutes against the Canberra Raiders in 2013, and in the 2017 Rugby League World Cup, Valentine Holmes scored a double hat-trick (6 tries) against Fiji.

Water polo
In water polo, if a player scores thrice in a game, a hat-trick is made.

See also

 Hitting for the cycle
 Nap hand
 Trifecta
 Triple Crown (disambiguation)
 Turkey (bowling)
 Triple double

References

1858 introductions
Hat-trick
Association football terminology
Bowling (cricket)
Cricket terminology
Field hockey terminology
Gaelic games terminology
Ice hockey terminology
Rugby league terminology
Rugby union terminology
Water polo terminology